Gilberto García (born 15 July 1959) is a Colombian former footballer. He competed in the men's tournament at the 1980 Summer Olympics.

References

External links
 
 

Living people
1959 births
People from Santa Marta
Colombian footballers
Colombia international footballers
Olympic footballers of Colombia
Footballers at the 1980 Summer Olympics
Association football forwards
Sportspeople from Magdalena Department
América de Cali footballers